Daniel I. Ross Jr. (December 31, 1923April 15, 2008) was the chairman of the South Carolina Republican Party from 1977 to 1979.

Ross is credited with starting the First in the South Primary in South Carolina.

Background 
Ross served in World War II as a corporal in the U.S. Army in the China-Burma-India Theater, where he was wounded in the leg leading to a nine-month hospitalization. From 1953 to his retirement in 1986, he worked at the Savannah River Plant with environmental monitoring and health protection.

Life in Politics 
In 1960, Ross started a lifelong involvement with the South Carolina Republican Party when he served on Richard Nixon's campaign in Barnwell County. Later he would work on campaigns for or promote William D. Workman, Jr., Floyd Spence, Jim Henderson, and Governor Jim Edwards.

Ross served two terms as Chairman of the South Carolina Republican Party, losing a third term to Dr. George C. Graham. During his term he was known for his fundraising and emphasis on grassroots campaigns. He would serve in the state party's Executive Committee until 2002.

References

External links 

 Daniel I. Ross, Jr. Papers at South Carolina Political Collections, University of South Carolina.

1923 births
2008 deaths
South Carolina Republicans
State political party chairs of South Carolina
People from Blackville, South Carolina
United States Army personnel of World War II